Portmarnock Community School is a public secondary school situated in Portmarnock, County Dublin. It was built by the Department of Education and Science in 1979, and was one of the first community schools built in Ireland. As of 2019, the school had an enrollment of over 900 students.

Notable alumni
Vincent May, drums, Kodaline
Jeremy McConnell, Irish model and reality TV star
Ryan O'Shaughnessy, singer/songwriter
Stephen Ward (footballer)

References

Educational institutions established in 1979
Secondary schools in Fingal
1979 establishments in Ireland
Community schools in the Republic of Ireland